This is a list of NCAA men's Division I ice hockey tournament all-time records, updated through the 2021 tournament.

*Alaska (2010), Denver (1973) and Wisconsin (1992) had their participations vacated due to NCAA rules violations. The stats here reflect official records.

References

All-Time Team Tecords